The aerobic gymnastics tournaments at the 2017 World Games in Wrocław was played between 21 and 22 July. One hundred sixteen aerobic gymnastics competitors, from 13 nations, participated in the tournament. The aerobic gymnastics competition took place at Centennial Hall in Lower Silesian Voivodeship.

Qualification

Qualification was based on the results of the 2016 Aerobic Gymnastics World Championships, held in Incheon, South Korea, from 17 to 19 June 2016.

At the end of the qualification round, the top five countries in each category will have earned places to compete in Wroclaw, with a maximum of one place per country. An additional berth in each discipline may be attributed by the FIG Executive Committee following the competition to assure host country participation or continental representation.

Schedule

Participating nations
The 116 aerobic gymnastics competitors, from 13 nations, participated in the tournament. The host country, Poland did not participate in this sport.

Medal table

Events

See also
Gymnastics at the 2016 Summer Olympics

References

External links
 Fédération Internationale de Gymnastique
 Gymnastics on IWGA website
 Schedule
 Entry list
 Medalists
 Medals standing
 Results book

 
2017 World Games
World Games
2017
International gymnastics competitions hosted by Poland